Chukwuemeka "Emeka" Odumegwu Ojukwu (4 November 1933 – 26 November 2011) was a Nigerian military officer, statesman and politician who served as the military governor of the Eastern Region of Nigeria in 1966 and as president of the secessionist Republic of Biafra from 1967 to 1970, which declared independence from Nigeria during the Nigerian Civil War. He was active as a politician from 1983 until his death in 2011 at the age of 78.

Early life and education
Chukwuemeka "Emeka" Odumegwu Ojukwu was born on 4 November 1933 at Zungeru in northern Nigeria to Sir Louis Odumegwu Ojukwu, an Igbo businessman from present-day Nnewi, Anambra State in south-eastern Nigeria. Sir Louis was in the transport business; he took advantage of the business boom during World War II to become the richest man in Nigeria. He began his educational career in Lagos, southwestern Nigeria.

Emeka Ojukwu started his secondary school education at CMS Grammar School, Lagos aged 10 in 1943. He later transferred to King's College, Lagos in 1944 where he was involved in a controversy leading to his brief imprisonment for assaulting a British teacher who put down a student strike action that he was a part of. This event generated widespread coverage in local newspapers. At 13, his father sent him to the United Kingdom to continue his education, first at Epsom College and later at Lincoln College, Oxford University, where he earned a master's degree in History. He returned to colonial Nigeria in 1956.

Early career
Ojukwu joined the civil service in Eastern Nigeria as an Administrative Officer at Udi, in present-day Enugu State. In 1957, after two years of working with the colonial civil service and seeking to break away from his father's influence over his civil service career, he left and joined the military initially enlisting as a non-commissioned officer (NCO) in Zaria.

Ojukwu's decision to enlist as an NCO was forced by his father's (Sir Louis) pulling of political strings with the then Governor-General of Nigeria (John Macpherson) to prevent Emeka from getting an officer-cadetship. Sir Louis and Governor-General Macpherson believed Emeka would not stick to the gruelling NCO schedule, however, Emeka persevered. After an incident in which Ojukwu corrected a drill sergeant's mispronunciation of the safety catch of the Lee-Enfield .303 rifle, the British Depot Commander recommended Emeka for an officer's commission.

From Zaria, Emeka proceeded first, to the Royal West African Frontier Force Training School in Teshie, Ghana and next, to Eaton Hall where he received his commission in March 1958 as a 2nd Lieutenant.

He was one of the first and few university graduates to receive an army commission. He later attended Infantry School in Warminster, the Small Arms School in Hythe. Upon completion of further military training, he was assigned to the Army's Fifth Battalion in Kaduna.

At that time, the Nigerian Military Forces had 250 officers and only 15 were Nigerians. There were 6,400 other ranks, of which 336 were British. After serving in the United Nations’ peacekeeping force in the Congo, under Major General Johnson Thomas Aguiyi-Ironsi, Ojukwu was promoted to Lieutenant-Colonel in 1964 and posted to Kano, where he was in charge of the 5th Battalion of the Nigerian Army.

1966 coups and events leading to the Nigerian Civil War
Lieutenant-Colonel Ojukwu was in Kano, northern Nigeria, when Major Patrick Chukwuma Kaduna Nzeogwu on 15 January 1966 executed and announced the bloody military coup in Kaduna, also in northern Nigeria. It is to Ojukwu's credit that the coup lost much steam in the north, where it had succeeded. Lt. Col. Odumegwu-Ojukwu supported the forces loyal to the Supreme Commander of the Nigerian Armed Forces, Major-General Aguiyi-Ironisi. Major Nzeogwu was in control of Kaduna, but the coup had failed in other parts of the country.

Aguiyi-Ironsi took over the leadership of the country and thus became the first military head of state. On Monday, 17 January 1966, he appointed military governors for the four regions. Lt. Col. Odumegwu-Ojukwu was appointed Military Governor of the Eastern Region. Others were: Lt.-Cols Hassan Usman Katsina (North), Francis Adekunle Fajuyi (West), and David Akpode Ejoor (Mid West). These men formed the Supreme Military Council with Brigadier B.A.O. Ogundipe, Chief of Staff, Supreme Headquarters, Lt. Col. Yakubu Gowon, Chief of Staff Army HQ, Commodore J. E. A. Wey, Head of Nigerian Navy, Lt. Col. George T. Kurubo, Head of Air Force, Col. Sittu Alao.

By 29 May, the 1966 anti-Igbo pogrom started. This presented problems for Odumegwu Ojukwu, as he did everything in his power to prevent reprisals and even encouraged people to return, as assurances for their safety had been given by his supposed colleagues up north and out west.

On 29 July 1966, a group of officers, including Majors Murtala Muhammed, Theophilus Yakubu Danjuma, and Martin Adamu, led the majority of Northern soldiers in a mutiny that later developed into a "Counter-Coup" or "July Rematch". The coup failed in the South-Eastern part of Nigeria where Ojukwu was the military Governor, due to the effort of the brigade commander and hesitation of northern officers stationed in the region (partly due to the mutiny leaders in the East being Northern whilst being surrounded by a large Eastern population).

The Supreme Commander General Aguiyi-Ironsi and his host Colonel Fajuyi were abducted and killed in Ibadan. On acknowledging Ironsi's death, Ojukwu insisted that the military hierarchy be preserved. The most senior army officer after Ironsi was Brigadier Babafemi Ogundipe. However, the leaders of the counter-coup insisted that Lieutenant Colonel Yakubu Gowon be made head of state, although both Gowon and Ojukwu were of the same rank in the Nigerian Army. Ogundipe could not muster enough force in Lagos to establish his authority as soldiers (Guard Battalion) available to him were under Joseph Nanven Garba, who was part of the coup. This realisation led Ogundipe to opt-out. Thus, Ojukwu's insistence could not be enforced by Ogundipe unless the coup plotters agreed (which they did not).  The fallout from this led to a standoff between Ojukwu and Gowon, leading to the sequence of events that resulted in the Nigerian civil war.

Biafra
In January 1967, the Nigerian military leadership went to Aburi, Ghana, for a peace conference hosted by General Joseph Ankrah. The implementation of the agreements reached by Aburi fell apart upon the leadership's return to Nigeria and on 30 May 1967, as a result of this, Colonel Odumegwu-Ojukwu declared Eastern Nigeria a sovereign state to be known as Biafra:

Having mandated me to proclaim on your behalf, and in your name, that Eastern Nigeria is a sovereign independent Republic, now, therefore I, Lieutenant Colonel Chukwuemeka Odumegwu-Ojukwu, Military Governor of Eastern Nigeria, by the authority, and under the principles recited above, do hereby solemnly proclaim that the territory and region known as and called Eastern Nigeria together with her continental shelf and territorial waters, shall, henceforth, be an independent sovereign state of the name and title of The Republic of Biafra.

On 6 July 1967, Gowon declared war and attacked Biafra. In addition to the Aburi Accord that tried to avoid the war, there was also the Niamey Peace Conference under President Hamani Diori (1968) and the OAU-sponsored Addis Ababa Conference (1968) under the chairmanship of Emperor Haile Selassie. This was the final effort by Generals Ojukwu and Gowon to settle the conflict via diplomacy.

During the war, in 1967, some members of the July 1966 alleged coup plot and Major Victor Banjo were executed for treason with the approval of Ojukwu, the Biafran Supreme commander. Major Ifeajuna was one of those executed. The defendants had argued that they sought a negotiated ceasefire with the federal government and were not guilty of treason.

After two and a half years of fighting and starvation, a hole appeared in the Biafran front lines and the Nigerian military exploited this. As it became obvious that the war was lost, Ojukwu was convinced to leave the country to avoid assassination. On 9 January 1970, he handed over power to his second in command, Chief of General Staff Major-General Philip Effiong, and left for Ivory Coast, where President Félix Houphouët-Boigny – who had recognised Biafra on 14 May 1968 – granted him political asylum.

Return to Nigeria
In 1981, Ojukwu began campaigning to return to Nigeria.  Nigerian president Shehu Aliyu Usman Shagari granted a pardon to Ojukwu on 18 May 1982, allowing him to return to Nigeria as a private citizen.  Ojukwu re-entered Nigeria from Ivory Coast on 18 June. Ojukwu declared his candidacy for the Nigerian Senate in 1983.  The official tally showed him losing by 12,000 votes, though a court attempted to reverse the ruling in September of that year, citing fraud in the election results. However, the disputed result was rendered moot when the Shagari government fell in the 1983 Nigerian coup d'état on 31 December. In early 1984 the Buhari regime jailed hundreds of political figures, including Ojukwu, who was held at the Kirikiri Maximum Security Prison. He was released later that year.

Ojukwu married Bianca Onoh (former Miss Intercontinental and future ambassador) in 1994, his third marriage. The couple had three children, Afamefuna, Chineme and Nwachukwu. In the Fourth Republic era, Ojukwu unsuccessfully contested the presidency in 2003 and 2007.

Death
On 26 November 2011, Ikemba Odumegwu Ojukwu died in the United Kingdom after a brief illness, aged 78. The Nigerian Army accorded him the highest military accolade and conducted a funeral parade for him in Abuja, Nigeria on 27 February 2012, the day his body was flown back to Nigeria from London before his burial on Friday 2 March. He was buried in a newly built mausoleum in his compound at Nnewi. Before his final interment, he had an elaborate weeklong funeral ceremony in Nigeria alongside Chief Obafemi Awolowo, whereby his body was carried around the five Eastern states, Imo, Abia, Enugu, Ebonyi, Anambra, including the nation's capital, Abuja. Memorial services and public events were also held in his honour in several places across Nigeria, including Lagos and Niger State, his birthplace, and as far away as Dallas, Texas, United States. His funeral was attended by President Goodluck Jonathan of Nigeria and ex-President Jerry Rawlings of Ghana among other personalities.

References

External links
 A Befitting Monument for Chukwuemeka Odumegwu Ojukwu
 News story regarding Odumegwu Ojukwu
 Lt. Colonel Chukwuemeka Ojukwu: "The East Is At The Crossroads", Prelude to Biafra, May 1967

1933 births
2011 deaths
People from Niger State
Igbo politicians
Igbo Army personnel
All Progressives Grand Alliance politicians
Presidents of Biafra
Candidates in the Nigerian general election, 2003
Candidates in the Nigerian general election, 2007
Graduates of the Mons Officer Cadet School
Nigerian Army officers
People educated at Epsom College
Alumni of Lincoln College, Oxford
King's College, Lagos alumni
CMS Grammar School, Lagos alumni
Biafran Armed Forces personnel
Recipients of Nigerian presidential pardons